WRBV (101.7 FM, "V101.7") is a radio station serving the Macon, Georgia area with an urban adult contemporary format. This station is under ownership of iHeartMedia, Inc.

External links
WRBV official website

RBV
Urban adult contemporary radio stations in the United States
IHeartMedia radio stations